The Seedwings Europe Vertigo is an Austrian high-wing, single-place, hang glider that was designed and produced by Seedwings Europe of Schlitters. Now out of production, when it was available the aircraft was supplied complete and ready-to-fly.

Design and development
The Vertigo was designed as a high performance competition hang glider with a topless design, lacking a kingpost and upper rigging. It is made from aluminum tubing, with the cross bar optionally available in carbon fibre for increased strength and reduced weight. The double-surface wing is covered in Dacron sailcloth on the bottom and Mylar on the top, with a special inward-pulled leading edge design sail.

The models are each named for their rough wing area in square metres.

Variants
Vertigo 13
Small-sized model for lighter pilots. The glider model is DHV 2-3 certified.
Vertigo 15
Large-sized model for heavier pilots. The glider model is DHV 2-3 certified.

Specifications (Vertigo 13)

References

Vertigo
Hang gliders